Alberto Curtolo (born 14 August 1984) is an Italian road bicycle racer.

Palmares

2005
 1st, Stage 9, Volta do Estado de São Paulo
 1st, Stage 1, Berliner Rundfahrt (U23)
2007
 1st, Stage 2a, Giro del Friuli Venezia Giulia

External links 

Italian male cyclists
1984 births
Living people
Sportspeople from Treviso
Cyclists from the Province of Treviso